The second USS Gretchen (SP-1181) was a United States Navy patrol vessel in commission from 1917 to 1919.

Gretchen was built as a civilian motorboat of the same name in 1902 by White of Belhaven, North Carolina. On 20 August 1917, the U.S. Navy acquired her from her owners, the North Carolina Fisheries Commission, for use as a section patrol boat during World War I. She was commissioned as USS Gretchen (SP-1181) at Oriental, North Carolina, on 24 August 1917.

After fitting out at Norfolk, Virginia, Gretchen was assigned to the 5th Naval District and based at the patrol station at Wanchese, North Carolina. She cruised Albemarle Sound and Pamlico Sound on section patrol duty for the remainder of World War I. She also performed inspection and patrol duties for the North Carolina Fisheries Commission during the period.

Gretchen was decommissioned and simultaneously returned to the fisheries commission on 1 January 1919.

References

NavSource Online: Section Patrol Craft Photo Archive: Gretchen (SP 1181)

Patrol vessels of the United States Navy
World War I patrol vessels of the United States
Ships built in North Carolina
1902 ships